Anarsia agricola is a moth of the  family Gelechiidae. It was described by Walsingham in 1891. It is found in the Democratic Republic of Congo, Kenya, Mozambique, Namibia, South Africa, Tanzania, Gambia, Zambia and Zimbabwe.

The larvae feed on Alchornea cordifolia and Combretum species.

References

agricola
Moths described in 1891
Moths of Sub-Saharan Africa